Wojciech Golla (born 12 January 1992) is a Polish professional footballer who plays as a centre-back for the Hungarian NB I side Puskás Akadémia. He previously played for Lech Poznań, Pogoń Szczecin, N.E.C. Nijmegen and Śląsk Wrocław.

Career statistics

Club

1 Including Promotion/relegation play-offs.

References

External links
 
 
 N.E.C. Nijmegen

Living people
1992 births
Association football defenders
Polish footballers
Poland youth international footballers
Poland under-21 international footballers
Polish expatriate footballers
Sparta Złotów players
Lech Poznań players
Pogoń Szczecin players
NEC Nijmegen players
Śląsk Wrocław players
Puskás Akadémia FC players
Ekstraklasa players
I liga players
Eredivisie players
Expatriate footballers in the Netherlands
Polish expatriate sportspeople in the Netherlands
Expatriate footballers in Hungary
Polish expatriate sportspeople in Hungary
People from Złotów
Sportspeople from Greater Poland Voivodeship
Poland international footballers